Let My Pride Be What's Left Behind is the third EP released by Manchester Orchestra in 2008. It was released via Favorite Gentlemen / Canvasback Recordings on October 7, 2008.

Track listing

Notes 
The song "I Can Feel A Hot One" was featured on the television show Gossip Girl in September 2008.

2008 EPs
Manchester Orchestra albums